Rachel Joyce may refer to:

Rachel Joyce (triathlete) (born 1978), English triathlete
Rachel Joyce (writer) (born 1962), British writer